Gustav Magenwirth GmbH & Co. KG, known as Magura, is a German company based in Bad Urach established in 1893 that produces and distributes engineered cycling products and service including cycle suspensions and brakes, sunglasses, helmets, packs, bags, and clothing.

References

Manufacturing companies established in 1893
Cycle manufacturers of Germany
Companies based in Baden-Württemberg
German companies established in 1893